The various academic faculties, departments, and institutes of the University of Oxford are organised into four divisions, each with its own Head and elected board. They are the Humanities Division; the Social Sciences Division; the Mathematical, Physical and Life Sciences Division; and the Medical Sciences Division.

Humanities Division
The Humanities Division has received considerable praise for its work at the forefront of digitising the Humanities. The Humanities Division has been physically expanding into the new Radcliffe Observatory Quarter in Oxford.

The current Head of the Humanities Division is Professor Karen O'Brien. Professor Sally Shuttleworth was Head from 2006 to 2011, Professor Shearer West served as Head between August 2011 and 2015, and Chris Wickham until 2018.

The Division contains the following faculties and departments:

 Rothermere American Institute
 Ruskin School of Art
 Faculty of Classics
 Faculty of English
 Faculty of History
 History of Art Department
 Faculty of Linguistics, Philology & Phonetics
 Faculty of Medieval and Modern Languages
 Faculty of Music
 Faculty of Oriental Studies
 Faculty of Philosophy
 Faculty of Theology and Religion
 The Oxford Research Centre in the Humanities (TORCH)
 Voltaire Foundation

Medical Sciences Division
Medicine has been taught at the University of Oxford since the 13th century. In 1770, John Radcliffe, an Oxford-educated physician founded the Radcliffe Infirmary. The current Head of the Division is Gavin Screaton, the current Divisional Registrar & Chief Operating Officer is Chris Price. Professor Alastair Buchan was head from 2007-2017

The Division contains the following Faculties and departments:
Department of Biochemistry
Nuffield Department of Clinical Medicine
Nuffield Department of Clinical Neurosciences
Department of Experimental Psychology
Radcliffe Department of Medicine
Department of Oncology
Nuffield Department of Orthopaedics, Rheumatology and Musculoskeletal Sciences
Department of Paediatrics
Sir William Dunn School of Pathology
Department of Pharmacology
Department of Physiology, Anatomy & Genetics
Nuffield Department of Population Health
Nuffield Department of Primary Care Health Sciences
Department of Psychiatry
Nuffield Department of Surgical Sciences
Nuffield Department of Women's & Reproductive Health

The Weatherall Institute of Molecular Medicine is a research institute of the Radcliffe Department of Medicine

The Wellcome Trust Centre for Human Genetics is a research institute of the Nuffield Department of Medicine.

The Collaborating Centre for Oxford University and CUHK for Disaster and Medical Humanitarian Response is a partnership between the Nuffield Department of Medicine and CUHK Faculty of Medicine.

The Nuffield Laboratory of Ophthalmology is a division of the Nuffield Department of Clinical Neurosciences.

The CRUK/MRC Oxford Institute for Radiation Oncology is a research institute of the Department of Oncology.

The Centre for Evidence-Based Medicine is a research centre of the Nuffield Department of Primary Care Health Sciences.

Mathematical, Physical and Life Sciences Division

From 2015 the head of the Mathematical, Physical and Life Sciences Division (MPLS) is Professor Donal Bradley. From 2007 to 2015 the head was Professor Alex Halliday.

The Division contains the following departments:
 Begbroke Science Park
 Department of Biology (formed from the merger of the Department of Plant Sciences and Department of Zoology)
 Department of Chemistry
 Department of Computer Science
 Doctoral Training Centre
 Department of Earth Sciences
 Department of Engineering Science
 Department of Materials
 Mathematical Institute
 Department of Physics
 Department of Statistics

Social Sciences Division
The Social Sciences Division represents the largest grouping of social sciences of any university in the United Kingdom. As a major provider of social science research, it is accredited by the Economic and Social Research Council as a Doctoral Training Centre of excellence in research training. From 2018 the division's head is Professor Sarah Whatmore. From 2008 to 2017 the head was Professor Roger Goodman.

The Division contains the following faculties and departments:
School of Anthropology and Museum Ethnography
School of Archaeology
Saïd Business School
Department of Economics
Department of Education
School of Geography and the Environment
Oxford School of Global and Area Studies
Blavatnik School of Government
Department of International Development
Oxford Internet Institute
Faculty of Law
Oxford Martin School
Department of Politics and International Relations
Department of Social Policy and Intervention
Department of Sociology

Gardens, Libraries and Museums
In 2016 Academic Services and University Collections (ASUC) changed its name to Gardens, Libraries and Museums (GLAM), and now operates as an effective fifth division of the university. Responsible for four museums (the Ashmolean Museum, the History of Science Museum, the Oxford University Museum of Natural History, and the Pitt Rivers Museum), the Bodleian Libraries, and the University of Oxford Botanic Garden, GLAM is overseen by the directors of the six GLAM departments chaired by the Pro-Vice-Chancellor (People & GLAM),  Anne Trefethen.

Department for Continuing Education
The Department for Continuing Education works with the divisions to promote continuing education.

References

External links
 Divisions and Departments
 Humanities Division
 Medical Sciences Division
 MPLS Division
 Social Sciences Division